Little Flowers is a Canadian short film, directed by Vincent Biron and released in 2010. The film centres on four children who are experiencing significant rites of passage for the first time, in the late summer as their return to the new school year looms.

The film premiered at the 2010 Toronto International Film Festival, where it won the Toronto International Film Festival Award for Best Canadian Short Film. It was subsequently named to TIFF's annual year-end Canada's Top Ten list of the year's best films.

References

2010 films
Canadian coming-of-age drama films
Films directed by Vincent Biron
French-language Canadian films
Canadian drama short films
2010s Canadian films